The 2022–23 Alaska Anchorage Seawolves men's ice hockey season was the 42nd season of play for the program and the 37th at the Division I level. The Seawolves represented the University of Alaska Anchorage and were coached by Matt Shasby in his 1st season.

Season
After the program was suspended due to a funding crisis at the school, a campaign was launched to save the program. At the outset, the university said that approximately $3 million dollars were required which would cover the operating cost of the ice hockey team for two years. While the team would be unable to compete during the 2021–22 season, the rapid fundraising that followed allowed the Seawolves to return after only a year hiatus.

The Seawolves played their first game in over two and a half year on the opening day of the regular season and gave their fans a present; Anchorage took down a ranked Western Michigan squad. It was the program's first win over a nationally ranked opponent since December 2016 and demonstrated that, despite their circumstances, this group of Seawolves were fighters. Due to the late nature of their schedule making, Anchorage wasn't able to get a full slate of games against Division I opponents, but they weren't forced to add too many additional games. The Seawolves inserted six exhibition matches into their schedule and, while they were able to win all of those games, they didn't receive any official credit for doing so. What those matches did do was allow the newly assembled team extra time to get used to one another and build some chemistry in the lineup.

The familiarity was needed since the Seawolves were only able to win once more in the first half of the season after taking down the Broncos. They entered the winter break on an 8-game losing streak which included 4 consecutive losses to rival Alaska. The team began the second half of the year by taking a trip southeast and met UMass Lowell, who were preparing for a potential run to the NCAA tournament. Instead, Anchorage swept the #13 River Hawks, giving the program its first such weekend since 2009. Trying to build on the sudden success, the Seawolves lost each of the next 5 games by just a single goal, with 4 coming in extra time. However, by the end of February the team seemed to have gotten things figured out and went 4–2–1 at the end of the season.

Departures

Note: Departures occurred prior the 2021–22 season.

Recruiting
As a result of the team being restarted, the entire roster consists of players new to the program.

Roster
As of June 30, 2022.

Standings

Schedule and results

|-
!colspan=12 style=";" | Exhibition

|-
!colspan=12 style=";" | Regular Season

Scoring statistics

Goaltending statistics

Rankings

Note: USCHO did not release a poll in weeks 1, 13, or 26.

References

Alaska Anchorage Seawolves men's ice hockey seasons
Alaska Anchorage Seawolves
Alaska Anchorage Seawolves
Alaska Anchorage Seawolves
Alaska Anchorage Seawolves